This is a list of scattering experiments.

Specific experiments of historical significance

 Davisson–Germer experiment
 Gold foil experiments, performed by Geiger and Marsden for Rutherford which discovered the atomic nucleus
 Elucidation of the structure of DNA by X-ray crystallography
 Discovery of the antiproton at the Bevatron
 Discovery of W and Z bosons at CERN
 Discovery of the Higgs boson at the Large Hadron Collider
 MINERνA

Types of experiment

Optical methods
 Compton scattering
 Raman scattering
 X-ray crystallography
 Biological small-angle scattering with X-rays, or Small-angle X-ray scattering
 Static light scattering
 Dynamic light scattering
 Polymer scattering with X-rays

Neutron-based methods
 Neutron scattering
 Biological small-angle scattering with neutrons, or Small-angle neutron scattering
 Polymer scattering with neutrons

Particle accelerators
 Electrostatic nuclear accelerator
 Linear induction accelerator
 Betatron
 Linear particle accelerator
 Cyclotron
 Synchrotron

Physics-related lists
Physics experiments
Chemistry-related lists
Biology-related lists